Jens Howe (born 17 February 1961) is a German fencer. He competed in the individual and team foil events for East Germany at the 1988 Summer Olympics.

References

External links
 

1961 births
Living people
People from Oschatz
People from Bezirk Leipzig
German male fencers
Sportspeople from Saxony
Olympic fencers of East Germany
Fencers at the 1988 Summer Olympics